Cantata is a genre of vocal music. It may also refer to:
 Cantata (film), a 1963 Hungarian film
 Cantata (software), Music Player Daemon client
 Cantata (Stravinsky), a 1950s composition by Igor Stravinsky
 Cantata++, software to test programs written in C and C++
 Cantata 140, a.k.a. The Crack in Space, a 1960s science fiction novel(la) by Philip K. Dick
 Cantata 700, a commercial background music system
 Cantata Peak, a mountain summit in Alaska
 Church cantata, a.k.a. sacred cantata, religious subset of the cantata genre

See also
 :Category:Cantatas